Shtandy (Ştände) is a rural locality (a village) and the administrative centre of Shtandinsky Selsoviet, Baltachevsky District, Bashkortostan, Russia. The population was 568 as of 2010. There are 10 streets.

Geography 
Shtandy is located 19 km northeast of Starobaltachevo (the district's administrative centre) by road. Ardagysh is the nearest rural locality.

References 

Rural localities in Baltachevsky District